Leon Viorescu (born 1886, Botoșani – died 1936, Bucharest) was a Romanian painter.

Career 
Viorescu graduated at the Belle Arte Art School of Iași, being from the same generation as Ștefan Dimitrescu and Nicolae Tonitza, who was a very good friend of Viorescu.

His main profession was that of a public clerk in the Romanian Ministry of Culture starting from 1920. The financial stability provided by his job was decisive for the start of his artistic career.

Viorescu chose pointillism for the main form of artistic expression but with a reinterpretation it his own personal painting style.

Viorescu approached landscape, interiors, still lifes , these styles defined him as master painter in the Romanian Interbelic era. Of all the topics, the most preferred were compositions which are remarked by the interior atmosphere created that are typical and unmistakable of his own style.

Gallery

Biography
"Note de Artă" în "Dimineața", 6 februarie 1927
 Dan Botta, "Cronica Plastică" în "Calendarul", nr 550, 31 decembrie 1933
 Petre Oprea, "Leon Viorescu", Pro Arte, nr. 9, 1998, pp. 12–13

References

External links

 Universul literar – 1927 * Ilustrare grafică de Leon Viorescu

1886 births
1936 deaths
People from Botoșani
Romanian painters